Beta-defensin 127 is a protein that in humans is encoded by the DEFB127 gene.

Defensins are cysteine-rich cationic polypeptides that are important in the immunologic response to invading microorganisms. The protein encoded by this gene is secreted and is a member of the beta defensin protein family. Beta defensin genes are found in several clusters throughout the genome, with this gene mapping to a cluster at 20p13.

References

Further reading

Defensins